Dhading District, a part of Bagmati Province, is one of the seventy-seven districts of Nepal.

Geography and climate
Dhading District spreads from 27'40" E to 28'17" E and 80'17"N to 84'35"N. The mountain range Ganesh Himal is the predominant mountain range located within Dhading. The  and the mountain Manaslu is clearly visible from much of Dhading, although it is located within the bounds of Gorkha. The transnational Prithivi Highway connecting Kathmandu and Pokhara runs through the southern portion of the district, making for easy access to the Kathmandu valley. The road parallels the Trishuli River. The western border with Gorkha is bisected by the Budhigandaki River.

The district is bounded by
East: Kathmandu, Rasuwa and Nuwakot
West: Gorkha
North: Rasuwa and Tibet
South: Makwanpur and Chitwan

Dhading is the only district of Nepal which ranges from the mountain Ganesh Himal to the Churevawar pradesh of Terai (Chitwan). The mountain range Ganesh is the predominant mountain range located within Dhading. The over  mountain Manaslu is clearly visible from much of Dhading, although it is located within the bounds of Gorkha. The transnational King Prithivi Highway connecting Kathmandu and Pokhara runs through the southern portion of the district, making for easy access too the Kathmandu valley. The road parallels the Trishuli River. Dhading is 80% farmland and 20% forest. The western border with Gorkha is bisected by the Budhigandaki River.

The people of the district are primarily Bhramin and Chetri in the south and Tamang and Gurung in the north, with much of the center Newari. Gurkha route, the birthplace of founder of Nepal King Prithivi Naryan Shah crosses through Dhading.

Rivers
The main river of the Dhading district is Budi Gandaki which comes from Ganesh Himal and passes through Arughat Bazaar and Salyantar and meets Ankhu khola at Narsingha Dhamm. Budhi Gandaki separates the district from Gorkha district. The Trusali River, which comes from Nuwakot, also passes through Dhading. There are 25 small rivers, the main being Charoudi, Malekhu, Galtukhola, Belkhukhola, Chiraudikhola, Maheshkhola, Aansi, Thopal, Manukhola, Kastekhola, and Mastekhola. Besides these, there are over 1743 smaller rivers, springs and seasonal streams.

Demographics
At the time of the 2011 Nepal census, Dhading district had a population of 336,067. Of these, 70.5% spoke Nepali, 20.1% Tamang, 2.5% Chepang, 2.1% Gurung, 1.9% Magar, 0.9% Newari, 0.7% Ghale, 0.5% Kumhali, 0.2% Bhojpuri, 0.1% Hindi, 0.1% Maithili, 0.1% Urdu and 0.1% other languages as their first language.

In terms of ethnicity/caste, 22.2% were Tamang, 15.0% Hill Brahmin, 14.6% Chhetri, 9.4% Newar, 8.5% Magar, 5.6% Gurung, 4.8% Sarki, 4.3% Chepang/Praja, 4.2% Kami, 2.5% Damai/Dholi, 2.0% Ghale, 1.4% Kumal, 1.0% Gharti/Bhujel, 1.0% Sanyasi/Dasnami, 0.9% Thakuri, 0.7% Rai, 0.3% Danuwar, 0.3% Musalman, 0.2% Darai, 0.2% Majhi, 0.1% Brahmu/Baramo, 0.1% Kamar, 0.1% Tharu and 0.2% others.

In terms of religion, 72.4% were Hindu, 20.6% Buddhist, 6.3% Christian, 0.3% Muslim, 0.2% Prakriti and 0.1% others.

In terms of literacy, 62.7% could both read and write, 2.5% could read but not write and 34.7% could neither read nor write. 

The people of the district are primarily Brahmin and Chhetri in the south and Ghale, Gurung and Tamang in the north, with much of the center Newari.

Religious temples
Dhading District has many religious temples. Among them is Tripurasundari Mai which lies in the northern part of the district. Siddha Than in Siddhalekh Rural Municipality is a Hindu religious site. Others include the Bhairabi Temple in Sunaula Bazar. Sri Nrsimha Dham Kshetra in Salyantar is a historical religious site for the Vedic Sanatan Hindu people, where Jagannath Foundation – Sri Rupanuga Para Vidyapeeth, Bimala Devi Temple, Shesa Temple, Sada Shiva and ancient Nrsimha Deva temple, and Ganga Jamuna temple are attractions. Kot Devi is a religious site in Jwalamukhi Rural Municipality, Maidi. Kalidevi Temple is also one of the popular religious temples (Devi Mandir) located in Dhunibeshi Municipality ward no. 6. Amleshwor Mahadev Temple in Mahesdovan, Jwalamukhi, is also one of the main religious temples of Dhading. Pasupatipati and Krishna mandir covers the district headquarter, Dhading Bensi. Madevthan of Palpa Bensi is also one of the religious sites of Dhading. Dhola Mandali temple of Dhola is a popular Hindu temple. Every Tuesday people used to cut she-goats in Mandali Thaan. Girls and women are not allowed to go there.The origin of the Muktinath temple of Mustang is Dhading. In Dhading, Muktinath Temple is located at Siddhalek Rular Municipality, nearly Kalupanda Marg.

Administration 
Dhanding district consists of two municipalities and 11 rural municipals.

Municipalities 

 Dhunibeshi
 Nilkantha

Rural municipals 

 Khaniyabas
 Gajuri
 Galchhi
 Gangajamuna
 Jwalamukhi
 Thakre
 Netrawati Dabjong
 Benighat Rorang
 Rubi Valley
 Siddhalek
 Tripurasundari

Towns and villages

Dhunibeshi Municipality
Khanikhola
Naubise
Gaucharan
Dharke
Jungekhola
Madhevbeshi
Simle
Aginchok
Baireni
Baseri
Benighat
Bhumesthan
Budhathum
Chainpur
Chhatre Dyaurali
Dangsing
Darkha
Dhola
Dhusha
Dhuwakot
Gajuri
Gaunkharka
Gerkhu
Ghussa
Goganpani
Gumdi
Jharlang
Jiwanpur
Jogimara
Jyamaruk
Kalleri
Katunje
Kebalpur
Khalte
Khari
Kiranchok
Kumpur
Lapa
Mahadevsthan
Maidi
Marpak
Mulpani
Murali Bhanjyang
Nalang
Naubise
Nilkantha Municipality
Phulkharka
Pida
Ranibari
Rigaun
Salang
Salyankot
Salyantar
Sangkosh
Satyadevi
Semjong
Sirtung
Sukabhanjyang
Sunaula Bazar
Tasarphu
Thakre
Tipling
Tripureshwar

See also

Charaundi (Commercial zone)
Zones of Nepal

References

External links
Official Website of Dhading district

 
Districts of Nepal established in 1962
Districts of Bagmati Province